Cerić is a village in eastern Croatia, located to the northeast of Vinkovci.

Cerić was first mentioned in historical documents in 1267, as part of the Monoštar estate. Today, Cerić is part of the Nuštar municipality.

During the Croatian War of Independence, Cerić was on the eastern front, and it was occupied by Serbian forces on October 2, 1991, to the detriment of the Croatian civilian population.

References

Populated places in Vukovar-Syrmia County
Populated places in Syrmia